Eskimo Trade Jargon was an Inuit pidgin used by the Mackenzie River Inuit as a trade language with the Athabaskan peoples to their south, such as the Gwich'in (Loucheux). It was reported by Stefánsson (1909), and was apparently distinct from the Athabaskan-based Loucheux Jargon of the same general area.

A reduced form of the pidgin was used for ships' trade at Herschel Island off the Arctic coast near Alaska.

References

North America Native-based pidgins and creoles
Inuit culture